Ball at Savoy (sometimes known as Ball at the Savoy) is a 1936 British operetta film directed by Victor Hanbury and starring Conrad Nagel, Marta Labarr and Fred Conyngham. The film is based on the 1932 operetta Ball im Savoy by Paul Abraham, which had been turned into an Austrian film in 1935. It was made at Elstree Studios.

A British diplomat falls in love with a famous singer when he meets her in Cannes.

Cast
 Conrad Nagel as John Egan/Baron Dupont  
 Marta Labarr as Anita Stella  
 Lu Ann Meredith as Mary  
 Fred Conyngham as George  
 Aubrey Mather as Herbert  
 Fred Duprez as Not Herbert  
 Bela Mila as Terese  
 Dino Galvani as Manager  
 Monti DeLyle as Stranger  
 Esther Kiss as Suzanne  
 Tony De Lungo as Maitre d'Hotel  
 Bruno Barnabe as Train Conductor

References

Bibliography
Low, Rachael. Filmmaking in 1930s Britain. George Allen & Unwin, 1985.
Wood, Linda. British Films, 1927–1939. British Film Institute, 1986.

External links

1936 films
British musical comedy films
British romantic comedy films
British black-and-white films
1936 musical comedy films
1936 romantic comedy films
Films directed by Victor Hanbury
Films shot at British International Pictures Studios
Operetta films
Films based on operettas
Films set in Cannes
Films scored by Paul Abraham
Remakes of Austrian films
Films scored by Jack Beaver
1930s romantic musical films
British romantic musical films
1930s English-language films
1930s British films